Dahalo is an endangered Cushitic language spoken by at most 400 Dahalo people on the coast of Kenya, near the mouth of the Tana River.  Dahalo is unusual among the world's languages in using all four airstream mechanisms found in human language - clicks, implosives, ejectives, and regular consonants.

While the language is known primarily as “Dahalo” to linguists, the term itself is an exonym supposedly used by Aweer-speakers that itself essentially means “stupid” or “worthless”. The speakers themselves refer to the language as “numma guhooni”.

Overview
The Dahalo, former elephant hunters, are dispersed among Swahili and other Bantu peoples, with no villages of their own, and are bilingual in those languages. Children no longer learn the language, which would make it moribund, and it may be extinct.

Dahalo has a highly diverse sound system using all four airstream mechanisms found in human language: clicks, ejectives, and implosives, as well as the universal pulmonic sounds.

In addition, Dahalo makes a number of uncommon distinctions. It contrasts laminal and apical stops, as in languages of Australia and California; epiglottal and glottal stops and fricatives, as in the Mideast, the Caucasus, and the American Pacific Northwest; and is perhaps the only language in the world to contrast alveolar lateral and palatal lateral fricatives and affricates.

It is suspected that the Dahalo may have once spoken a Sandawe- or Hadza-like language, and that they retained clicks in some words when they shifted to Cushitic, because many of the words with clicks are basic vocabulary. If so, the clicks represent a substratum.

Dahalo is also called Sanye, a name shared with neighboring Waata, also spoken by former hunter-gatherers. The Waata may once have spoken a language more like Dahalo before shifting to Oromo. 

The classification of Dahalo is obscure. Traditionally included in South Cushitic, Tosco (1991) argues instead that it is East Cushitic, and Kießling (2001) agrees that it has too many Eastern features to be South Cushitic.

Phonology

Consonants
Dahalo has, by all accounts, a large consonant inventory. 62 consonants are reported by Maddieson et al. (1993), whereas Tosco (1991) recognizes 50. The inventory according to the former is presented below:

Thus, for legibility, the alternative letter  is used here; this is found in a few sources such as Elderkin. They may freely vary as lateral clicks. 

This typologically extraordinary inventory appears to result from extended contact influence from substratal and superstratal languages, due to long-running bilinguality. Only 27 consonants (shown in bold) are found in the final position of verbal stems, which Tosco suggests represents the inherited Cushitic component of the consonant inventory.

Several phonemes can be shown to be recent intrusions into the language through loanwords:
  is only found in loanwords from Swahili.
  is only found in loanwords from Swahili and Somali.
Additionally, several consonants are marginal in their occurrence. Five are only attested in a single root:
 
 , in  'place where maize is seasoned'
 , in  'centipede'
 , in  'to pinch'.
 , in  'mother'.

The prenasalized voiceless stops have been analyzed as syllabic nasals plus stops by some researchers. However, one would expect this additional syllable to give Dahalo words additional tonic possibilities, as Dahalo pitch accent is syllable-dependent (see below), and Maddieson et al. report that this does not seem to be the case. Tosco (1991) analyzes these as consonant clusters, on the grounds that Dahalo allows long vowels in open syllables only, and that while words such as /tʃaːⁿda/ 'finger' can be found, only short vowels occur preceding the alleged voiceless prenasalized consonants.

Allophony

The laminal coronals are denti-alveolar, whereas the apicals are alveolar tending toward post-alveolar.

When geminate, the epiglottals are a voiceless stop and fricative. (Thus  is not pharyngeal as sometimes reported, since pharyngeal stops are not believed to be possible.) In utterance-initial position they may be a partially voiced (negative voice onset time) stop and fricative. However, as singletons between vowels,  is a flap or even an approximant with weak voicing, whereas  is a fully voiced approximant. Other obstruents are similarly affected intervocalically, though not to the same degree.

 are often opened to approximants  or weak fricatives  between vowels (the retraction diacritic in  serves merely to emphasize that it is further back than ).

There is a lot of variability in the voicing of clicks, so this distinction may be being lost. The nasal clicks are nasalized prior to the click release and are voiced throughout; the voiceless clicks usually have about 30ms of voice onset time, but sometimes less. There is no voiceless nasal airflow, but following vowels may have a slightly nasalized onset. Thus these clicks are similar to glottalized nasal clicks in other languages. Voiceless clicks are much more common than voiced clicks.

Vowels
Dahalo has a symmetric 5-vowel system of pairs of short and long vowels, totaling 10 vowels:

Phonotactics
Dahalo words are commonly 2–4 syllables long. Syllables are exclusively of the CV pattern, except that consonants may be geminate between vowels. As with many other Afroasiatic languages, gemination is grammatically productive. Voiced consonants partially devoice, and prenasalized stops denasalize when geminated as part of a grammatical function. However, lexical prenasalised geminate stops also occur.

Dahalo has pitch accent, normally with zero to one high-pitched syllables (rarely more) per root word. If there is a high pitch, it is most frequently on the first syllable; in the case of disyllabic words, this is the only possibility: e.g.  head,  pierce.

Status of clicks
Dahalo is one of very few languages outside southern Africa to have phonemic clicks (the others being Sandawe and Hadza in Tanzania and Damin, a ceremonial register of Lardil formerly spoken on Mornington Island in Australia). The clicks in Dahalo are not Cushitic in origin, and may be a remnant of a shift from a non-Cushitic language. Ten Raa shows some slight evidence that speakers of Dahalo once spoke a language similar to Sandawe, which does have clicks. This might explain why clicks are only present in about 40 lexical items, some of which are basic (e.g. "breast," "saliva," and "forest").

Ehret reported that different words had either dental and lateral clicks, while Elderkin reported that these were allophones. It's not clear if an old distinction has merged, or if the place of articulation is variable because there is no distinction to maintain.

References

External links
 Dahalo Swadesh List

South Cushitic languages
Languages of Kenya
Endangered languages of Africa
Click languages